Malino is a village in the municipality of Sveti Nikole, North Macedonia.

Demographics
The village has a total population of 20 inhabitants. The ethnic makeup of the village according to the 2021 census is as follows:

Macedonians 18
Albanian 2

References

Villages in Sveti Nikole Municipality